The Christmas Island blind snake (Ramphotyphlops exocoeti) is a species of snake in the family Typhlopidae.  The species is endemic to Christmas Island. There are no subspecies that are recognized as being valid.

Etymology
The specific name, exocoeti, which means "flying fish", is in honor of the officers of HMS Flying Fish, who collected the holotype.

Geographic range
R. exocoeti is only found on Christmas Island (Australia).  The type locality given is "Christmas Island, Indian Ocean".

Habitat

Description

Behavior
R. exocoeti is terrestrisl and fossorial.

Reproduction
R. exocoeti is oviparous.

Conservation status
The species R. exocoeti is classified as Endangered (EN) on the IUCN Red List with the following criteria: D2 (v2.3, 1994). This means that it is not Critically Endangered, but is facing a high risk of extinction in the wild in the medium-term future. This is because the population is very small and characterized by an acute restriction in its area of occupancy. It is therefore prone to the effects of human activities (or stochastic events, the impact of which is increased by human activities) within a very short period of time in an unforeseeable future. Therefore, it is possible that this species may become Critically Endangered or even Extinct within a very short period of time.

See also

 List of reptiles of Christmas Island

References

Further reading

Boulenger GA (1887). "III. Reptiles". pp. 516–517. In: Günther A (1887). "Report on a Zoological Collection made by the Officers of H.M.S. 'Flying Fish' at Christmas Island, Indian Ocean". Proceedings of the Zoological Society of London 1887: 507-526 + Plates XLI-XLIV. (Typhlops exocœti, new species, p. 517).
Boulenger GA (1893). Catalogue of the Snakes in the British Museum (Natural History). Volume I., Containing the Families Typhlopidae .... London: Trustees of the British Museum (Natural History). (Taylor and Francis, printers). xiii + 448 pp. + Plates I–XXVIII. (Typhlops exocoeti, p. 36 + Plate III, figures 2a–2c).
Gibson-Hill CA (1940). "The Terrestrial Reptiles [of Christmas Island]". Bulletin of the Raffles Museum (18): 81–86. (Typhlops exocoeti).

External links
 

Ramphotyphlops
Snakes of Australia
Vulnerable fauna of Australia
Fauna of Christmas Island
Reptiles described in 1887
Taxa named by George Albert Boulenger
Endemic fauna of Australia